Mavuji River is located in entirely in Kilwa District of  Lindi Region, Tanzania. It begins in Nanjirinji ward and drains on the Indian Ocean on the shore of Mandawa ward. The river is the fourth largest and longest in Lindi region .

References

Rivers of Lindi Region
Rivers of Tanzania